Sing Galing! is a Philippine musical videoke singing reality game show created and developed by the Associated Broadcasting Company (now TV5). The show had become a household name and a constant top-rated show during its first run on ABC and enjoys recognition as one of the most successful, original and innovative shows in Philippine television history.

The show first aired on March 6, 1998, with Ai-Ai delas Alas, Allan K., and Kristine Florendo served as its first hosts. It was renamed Sing Galing: The Trio-oke Showdown in 2004 with both delas Alas and Lapus served as hosts; then renamed again to Sing Galing ni Pops the same year hosted by Lapus and Pops Fernandez, until the end of its original run on April 30, 2005. It was also the launching path for comedian Ethel Gabison also known as Ethel Booba, Pinoy Dream Academy Season 2 winner Laarni Lozada, and Philippine Idol winner Mau Marcelo.

It was then revived in 2021, produced by Cornerstone Studios for Cignal Entertainment (TV5's entertainment blocktimer), it premiered on April 5, 2021, as part of the network's TodoMax Primetime block. The show is a broadcast worldwide via Kapatid Channel. On June 20, 2022, the show is also broadcast worldwide via The Filipino Channel.

History

Initial interation
The program premiered on March 6, 1998, with comedian Allan K. and beauty queen Kristine Florendo as hosts.

The show's mechanics were simple – the contestants must know the right lyrics to any randomly chosen song, be it Filipino or foreign, without going out of tune. If the contestant fails to sing the right lyrics and in tune, an animated genie would pop up on the screen and strike an animated gong to signal the end of the unfortunate aspirant's chance at instant wealth and glory.

After a few months, ABC chose comedian extraordinaire Ai-Ai delas Alas to replace Florendo as Allan K.'s co-host. It was a serendipitous choice – Ai-Ai and Allan were best friends and they had perfect chemistry. The show was a big success during the incumbency of this team which lasted a long time. It was the "golden era" for Sing Galing.

When Allan K. had to leave for the competing program All Star K! on GMA Network, John Lapus replaced him. Delas Alas and Lapus took Sing Galing to a new level; the title and mechanics were altered. Sing Galing the Trio-Oke Showdown, the tweaked version, premiered in March 2004.

Instead of four individual contestants vying for the "Videoke Singing Star of the Night" title, the new Sing Galing had three groups with three members each to compete in the elimination round. The trio must have something in common – like the same occupation. They could be a group of beauticians, clerks or drivers and so forth. In the elimination round, the three members of each group will take turns in singing a portion of the song assigned by the pachinko machine.

It wasn't long before the show would lose Ai-Ai as her mother network ABS-CBN suddenly invoked an exclusivity clause in their contract. By that time, she was doing the TV adaptation of Ang Tanging Ina which was aired along this program, aside to this are her other commitments with the network. ABC retained John Lapus, however, and acquired Pops Fernandez, who used to star in a self-titled musical variety show P.O.P.S. (Pops On Primetime Saturday) on ABC in the early 1990s, to co-host with John. In October 2004, Fernandez and Lapus gave a new spin to Sing Galing which then became Sing Galing ni Pops.

2021 revival
In 2021, it was revealed that the show would be revived as a blocktimer on TV5 by Cignal Entertainment with Cornerstone Studios as a line producer on April 5, replacing APT Entertainment-produced game shows Fill in the Bank and Bawal Na Game Show.

Hosts

As Sing Galing (1998–2004)
Kristine Florendo (1998)
Ai-Ai delas Alas (1998–2004)
Allan K. (1998–2004)
John Lapus (substitute host for Allan K., 1998–2002; host, 2004)

As Sing Galing: The Trio-oke Showdown (2004)
Ai-Ai delas Alas
John Lapus

As Sing Galing ni Pops (2004–2005)
Pops Fernandez
John Lapus

As Sing Galing (2021–)
The hosts, dubbed as "SingMasters" in the show:
Randy Santiago
K Brosas
Donita Nose
Zendee (substitute host for Donita Nose)

Online host
Popular Filipino TikToker Zendee serves as the host of the show's online companion show titled Now Zending.

Judges
The judges for the 2021 relaunch, dubbed as "Jukebosses" in the show:
Rey Valera
Jessa Zaragoza (season 1)
Ronnie Liang
Bayani Agbayani (substitute for Jessa Zaragoza; season 1)
Allan K (substitute for Jessa Zaragoza; season 1)
Dingdong Avanzado (substitute for Jessa Zaragoza; Sing-lebrity Edition)
Ethel Booba (substitute for Ronnie Liang; Sing-lebrity Edition; Sing Galing Kids)
Jona Viray (season 2; Sing Galing Kids)
Ariel Rivera (season 2)
 Morissette (Sing Galing Kids)
 Gloc-9 (Sing Galing Kids)

Introducing
The show also features popular Filipino TikTokers, dubbed as "SingTokers" & "Junior SingTokers" in the show:
Yukii Takahashi
Billy Basilisco
Niko Badayos
Queenay (Sing-lebrity Edition)
Eli Padilla (season 2)
Dane (season 2)
Yanyan De Jesus (season 2)
Gabriel Pascual (season 2)
Daniel Bernardo (season 2)
Yoyo Alvero (Sing Galing Kids)
Tyronia Fowler (Sing Galing Kids)

Gameplay
For the 2021 relaunch:

Random-I-Sing
A first round where contestants will choose a random code from the Videoke Player; whoever will get the lowest score will not proceed to the next round.

Hula-Oke
In this second round, Ka-Awitbahay will provide clues that will serve as Sikre-Songs. Then the contestants choose the secret song.

Duelo-Oke
A final round where the daily contender will compete with the defending champion. Defending champion has a power to choose which song will be sang and the highest score will be the defending champion.

Kanta o Kaban

A-Sing-Tado
A bonus round for defending champion where a song will be played and the player need to fill the missing words. Unlike season 1, Pachinko Ball will return and will be winning up to ₱100,000.

Home video release
In the year 2000, Ivory Records (now currently as Ivory Music & Video) released a limited edition Sing Galing VCD featuring the songs that are usually played and used as musical piece by the contestants.
 
The songs included are:

Sexbomb by Tom Jones feat Mousse T.
Hanggang Kailan by Nerissa
Livin' la Vida Loca by Ricky Martin
Kung Maibabalik Ko Lang by Regine Velasquez
We're All Alone by Zsa Zsa Padilla
Crying Time by Jolina Magdangal
Bridge over Troubled Water by Zsa Zsa Padilla
I'll Never Fall In Love Again by Tom Jones
Ikaw ang Lahat sa Akin by Martin Nievera
Everyday I Love You by Boyzone
Just Once by James Ingram
Hindi Ko Kaya by Richard Reynoso
Vision of Love by Mariah Carey
Get Here by Oleta Adams
Dancing Queen by ABBA

Spin-offs
In 2012, another TV5-produced variety show Game 'N Go had a spinoff segment of the program called Sing Galing Go.

Sing Galing: Sing-lebrity Edition
The original karaoke show expands the celebration every Saturday with Sing Galing: Sing-lebrity Edition, which aims to provide fun, laughter, music and excitement with the added goal of  helping as celebrities sing and play for their chosen beneficiaries.

For Saturday’s show, Sing Galing: Sing-lebrity Edition parade a new list of Jukebosses with Dingdong Avanzado (D’OPM Hearthrob), Ethel Booba (Champion Diva), and Allan K (OG Singmaster).

Every Saturday, the sing-lebrity will compete in the following rounds: Random-I-Sing: Kantarantahan, Hula-Oke Ka Lang D’yan? and the final round, Duelo-Oke Extreme. When the grand Bida-oke Sing-lebrity of the Night is declared, they will have a chance to win for their chosen bida-ficiary in the bonus round: A-Sing-Tado Level Up.  The lucky chosen star-ficiary can be an individual or a group.

The series concluded on March 5, 2022, and was replaced by the 2nd season of Masked Singer Pilipinas on March 19. The grand finals were also held at the Manila Metropolitan Theater and was broadcast live on TV5 and it was a replay episode that aired on March 20.

Patrick Quiroz was hailed as a first Ultimate Bida-oke Sing-lebrity of this season. He won ₱1,000,000 with his selected bidaficiary receiving ₱100,000.

Sing Galing Kids
This edition ended on December 3, 2022, and was replaced by "The Brilliant Life" on December 17. The grand finals was also held at the Manila Metropolitan Theater and was broadcast live on TV5.

Broadcast
The show airs every Monday, Tuesday and Thursday from 6:30 p.m. to 7:15 p.m. (PST), and every Saturday 6:00 p.m. to 7:00 p.m. (PST). Originally, the show also aired on Wednesdays and Fridays prior to the start of the 2021 PBA season.

The June 16 and 18, 2021 episodes of the show were pre-empted to give way for the 2021 FIBA Asia Cup Qualifiers matches involving the Philippines men's national basketball team.

Also, the Wednesday and Friday episodes from July 16, 2021, onwards were pre-empted to give way to the 2021 PBA season. beginning with the 2021 PBA Philippine Cup. Despite the season ending, the show's Wednesday and Friday airings did return.

Marimar Tua Parayao was hailed as an Ultimate Bida-oke Star of the first season. She won ₱1,000,000, House and Lot from Bria and a trophy.

The April 14, 2022, episode of the show were pre-empted to give way for the Maundy Thursday special programming in observance of Holy Week.

On May 9, 2022, the show was pre-empted to give way for the TV5's Bilang Pilipino 2022 coverage on the 2022 Philippine general election.

On June 20, 2022, the show began broadcasting worldwide via ABS-CBN's 24-hour international television network, The Filipino Channel.

On September 12 to 16, 2022, this show had a 5-night special.

On December 3, 2022, Sing Galing Kids has been ended. Emil Malaborbor was hailed as an Ultimate Bida-o-kid Star.

On December 10, 2022, Sing Galing Season 2 ended with Carmela Lorzano hailed as the Ultimate Bida-Oke Star of the second season.

On December 12 to 22, 2022, the show aired a Pasko-Oke Special with its new timeslot at 7:00 pm.

Awards and recognition
PMPC Star Awards for Television
2000 Winner, Best Game Show
2003 Winner, Best Game Show and Best Game Show Host for Ai-Ai delas Alas and Allan K.
2004 Winner, Best Game Show and Best Game Show Host for Ai-Ai delas Alas and John Lapus

For the relaunch:

See also
List of programs aired by TV5 (Philippine TV network)

References

External links

Philippine game shows
TV5 (Philippine TV network) original programming
Philippine reality television series
Singing talent shows
1990s Philippine television series
1998 Philippine television series debuts
2022 Philippine television series endings
Filipino-language television shows